Nova (Frankie Raye) is a fictional character appearing in American comic books published by Marvel Comics.

Frankie Raye was portrayed by Beau Garrett in the 2007 film Fantastic Four: Rise of the Silver Surfer.

Publication history

The character first appeared as Frankie Raye in Fantastic Four #164 (November 1975) and was created by writer Roy Thomas and artist George Pérez. After several years as a minor supporting character, she became a herald of Galactus and assumed the name "Nova" in Fantastic Four #244 (July 1982) by John Byrne.  The character was killed in Silver Surfer #75 (December 1992). Writer Kathryn Immonen and artist Tonči Zonjić revived Frankie Raye in the Heralds limited series in 2010.

Fictional character biography
Frankie Raye worked for the United Nations as an interpreter. She met Johnny Storm and became his girlfriend, despite her fear of fire. The couple soon broke up, despite an attempt at reconciliation by Johnny. A brief encounter by the two some time later results in an unpleasant reaction by Frankie. They eventually begin to see each other again. Her fear was eventually explained to be the result of a mental block induced by her stepfather, Phineas Horton, after she was accidentally doused with the chemicals which caused the android original Human Torch (his creation) to burst into flame, in an attempt to prevent her from using the Torch-like powers granted to her by the accident.

After breaking through the block, she regained her full memory and discovered her previously repressed superhuman powers. She aided the Fantastic Four for a short time, until she volunteered to become the new herald of Galactus. She took the name "Nova". Having previously demonstrated what the Fantastic Four deemed an alarming willingness to kill opponents, she claimed to have no compunction about leading him to sentient populated planets and proved that when she led the Devourer of Worlds to the Skrull home-world to consume it. Nova later attended the trial of Reed Richards by the Shi'ar Empire. When Richard Rider resumed his Nova identity alongside the New Warriors, he was briefly called "Kid Nova" to distinguish him from Raye.

Nova was later rescued from Skrull imprisonment by the Silver Surfer, whom she met for the first time. She then battled the Elders of the Universe. Galactus sent her to locate one of the Elders, the Contemplator, and she was joined in this quest by the Silver Surfer. They journeyed to the Coal Sack Nebula where they were captured by Captain Reptyl. After battling Captain Reptyl, Nova battled Ronan the Accuser. This was followed by a clash with a Skrull duplicate of the Silver Surfer and a romantic flirtation with the real Silver Surfer. Nova and Galactus battled the In-Betweener. Nova then turned her romantic interests toward Firelord.

Nova later encountered an injured Elan. She battled the second Star-Stalker, and then met the Power Pack. A stimulator device temporarily rendered her evil, until she was subdued by Reed and Franklin Richards, and Power Pack.

Frankie Raye was ultimately killed by the alien Morg, who had replaced her as Galactus' herald. The demon Mephisto later made it appear that she had returned from the dead in a failed bid to steal the soul of the Silver Surfer.

In the weekly mini-series Heralds, a character resembling Frankie Raye appears. Her named is Frances Hyatt and she's a waitress at Stu's Diner in Nevada. One night, while she was working, a strange explosion coming from space creates a chaotic situation when a S.W.O.R.D. facility is destroyed, and the sky on Earth is filled by a flash that seemed to enter Frances. When patrons came to her assistance, she lashed out, stabbing a customer. She ran out and began driving, only to crash and met a man who she called 'father'. This man was Professor Horton, long dead, who turned out to be an escaped clone from the S.W.O.R.D. facility. Upon hear him calling her 'Frakie', Frances burst into flames causing a massive explosion which kills the clone of Frankie's father."

Frances awoke in a ditch, trying to muster the strength to get up. She was found by the female superheroes Emma Frost, Hellcat, Monica Rambeau, She-Hulk and Valkyrie who were trying to get to the bottom of the mystery. Frances went with them to the Baxter Building, home of the Fantastic Four, in the hopes of obtaining some answers. They were amazed by Frances' resemblance to their old friend Frankie Raye, the one who would become Nova: Herald of Galactus. Though Nova was long dead, somehow S.W.O.R.D. had a similar entity captured and Frances appeared to be almost the same girl who once hosted it. When the clones escaped the S.W.O.R.D. holding facility in Nevada, so did the Nova entity and it bonded with Johnny Storm while looking for Frankie.

The Nova entity escaped Johnny but when it was unable to take Frances, it fled setting a trap at Frankie Raye's former apartment. After relaying the story of the Silver Surfer, who at some point in time, approached a 14 year old Frances and placed a portion of Frankie Raye's essence into her hoping to later reunite it with the Nova essence, Frances went to Frankie's apartment to attempt to awaken more of Frankie's memories. There, the Nova entity kidnapped Valeria Richards, daughter of Mister Fantastic and the Invisible Woman, instead. Frances accompanied the team into space where they discovered Valeria and the Nova entity in the heart of a star. The Nova entity cocooned Valeria in a strange substance. That substance turned out to be the suit Professor Horton had made for Frankie Raye to suppress her powers long ago, somehow animated by the Power Cosmic becoming the "Nova entity" itself.

Emma Frost sensed that both Valeria and the Nova entities minds were active in this cocoon. The Invisible Woman and She-Hulk managed to pull Valeria from the living suit while Frances looked on in horror. When the suit attempted to bond with the Invisible Woman, it spoke to Frances. It told her to save them, to be brave. Frances knew what she had to do, jumping in the way to become bonded with the being, just as the Silver Surfer had told her would happen. While she was bonding with the suit, she remembered the words of Hellcat and Silver Surfer, claiming to not be as strong as they said she was. It is unknown what exactly happened after she became 'Supernova', but she left the team abruptly, returning to Earth. Although Frances was unchanged on the inside, she now was confused and possessed great power. She returned to the diner where she worked, not knowing what she was looking for. Following a conversation with the new waitress, Frances flew away trying to figure out what she wanted with her new life.

It was left ambiguous however if Frances Hyatt was actually a separate person that was randomly chosen by the Silver Surfer to be the one to bond with the remaining essence and powers of the slain Frankie or rather, she was actually a clone of Frankie Raye. Nevertheless Frances as Nova was later recruited by the Fearless Defenders to fight the Doom Maidens.

Thor later summoned Nova along with other former Heralds of Galactus to Asgard after the Devourer of Worlds crash landed there following his confrontation with the Black Winter.

Powers and abilities
Nova originally gained her superhuman powers as the result of a mutagenic reaction to an exposure to unknown chemicals. Originally, she had powers similar to that of the Human Torch: flame generation, projection, and flight.

Her powers were later enhanced exponentially by the infusion of cosmic energies by the world-devourer Galactus. She gained metahuman strength, stamina, durability, agility, and reflexes. She had the ability to manipulate cosmic energy in the form of stellar fire, and which allowed her to project any form of energy possessed by a star, including heat, light, gravity, radio waves and charged particles. She also had the ability to project streams of stellar fire for distances in the hundreds of miles, and to mentally control the flame she projects (for instance, to maintain a sustained ring around a person or object at a fixed distance). She also has the ability to fly at superluminal speeds through intergalactic space and traverse hyper-space. Finally, she possessed near-total physical invulnerability, as was evident when she was once punched by Phoenix III with such force that it launched her from Earth and slammed her into the moon's surface, forming an impact crater in the process. She later expressed amazement that she was able to even survive such a blow, let alone withstand it completely uninjured. Nova's entire body, particularly her head, is plumed with cosmic energy resembling flames.

Frankie Raye was fluent in more than one language besides English.

Other versions
An alternate universe version of Hercules encountered Nova in the 24th century in the first Hercules limited series by writer/artist Bob Layton.

Writer-penciler John Byrne and inker Terry Austin produced a serialized story titled "The Last Galactus Story",  which appeared in the anthology comics-magazine Epic Illustrated #26-34 (October 1984 - February 1986), and detailed an all-new adventure for the character. The magazine published the first nine serialized installments of what was to be a 10-part tale. Each ran six pages, with the exception of part eight, which ran 12 pages. The magazine was cancelled as of February 1986, leaving the last chapter unpublished and the story unfinished. According to notes at Byrne's website, the conclusion of the story would see a dying Galactus releasing his power causing a new Big Bang and transforming his herald Nova into the Galactus for the new universe.

During the Fantastic Four's fight with Abraxas, they were briefly allied with an alternate version of Nova. It was revealed at the conclusion that she was actually allied with Abraxas after her Galactus destroyed Earth even after accepting her as his herald. Nova transferred her anger for her failure to the Fantastic Four of the Earth-616 universe in the absence of her own. Abraxas subsequently drew in an army of Novas who had experienced similar traumas to keep the Fantastic Four occupied while he acquired the Ultimate Nullifier, the resulting army of Novas requiring the Fantastic Four to summon the assistance of an army of alternate Avengers just to keep the Novas occupied.

In other media

Television
 Nova appears in the Fantastic Four episode "When Calls Galactus", voiced by Leeza Miller McGee. This version obtained powers after being accidentally doused in the chemicals that gave the android Human Torch his powers. She is transformed into her herald form when joining Galactus, after giving him enough power to survive the effects of the poisoned planet he'd consumed earlier without the need to devour Earth.
 Nova appears in Silver Surfer, voiced by Tara Rosling. This version is a mutant with clairvoyant powers. She is given her herald powers by Galactus when he chooses her as his herald in place of the Silver Surfer.
 Frankie Raye appears in the Fantastic Four: World's Greatest Heroes episode "Zoned Out", voiced by Tabitha St. Germain. As Johnny's date, he takes her to the Baxter Building and Reed Richards' lab. He claims that the lab is his own, when he lies to impress her by claiming to be a scientist himself. Frankie inadvertently activates Reed's Negative Zone gauntlet mistaking it for a toy, drawing herself into the Zone, though Johnny eventually saves her.

Toys
 A Nova Minimate is featured in the Toys "R" Us exclusive Heralds of Galactus boxset.

 A Marvel Legends figure of Frankie Raye as Nova is one of several figures included with the HasLab Marvel Legends figure of Galactus.

Film
 Frankie Raye appears in Fantastic Four: Rise of the Silver Surfer, portrayed by Beau Garrett. This version is a U.S. Army Captain and Johnny's love interest. Frankie and General Hager search for Reed Richards from the Baxter Building to his bachelor party at a nightclub, about the "attacks" from the Silver Surfer, forcing him to find a way to stop the humanoid surfer. When the Surfer is captured, thanks to an agreement the Army had made with Victor Von Doom, Frankie has the Fantastic Four imprisoned, too, but when Doom steals the Surfer's powers and breaks free, she helps the heroes escape to follow and stop him. She is later seen at Sue Storm and Reed Richard's wedding, trying to catch the bouquet. Just a moment before she manages to take it, Johnny burns it in the air.

References

External links
 
 
 
 
 

Characters created by George Pérez
Characters created by Roy Thomas
Comics characters introduced in 1975
Fantastic Four
Fictional characters with fire or heat abilities
Marvel Comics female superheroes
Marvel Comics mutates